MARSEC (MARitime SECurity) is the three-tiered United States Coast Guard Maritime Security system (alert state) designed to easily communicate to the Coast Guard and the maritime industry pre-planned scalable responses for credible threats. Its objective is to provide an assessment of possible terrorist activity within the maritime sectors of transportation, including threats to nautical facilities and vessels falling within the jurisdiction of the United States that could be targets of attack.

The Coast Guard originally created MARSEC to be compatible with, and respond in unison to the Department of Homeland Security’s (DHS) Homeland Security Advisory System (HSAS). With the introduction of the National Terrorism Advisory System (NTAS) to replace HSAS, the Commandant of the Coast Guard will adjust the MARSEC Level, if appropriate, based on any NTAS Alert issued by DHS.

Alert levels
Under the HSAS there were three levels to the system: 
 Level 1 – Corresponding with the HSAS levels Green, Blue, or Yellow, or no NTAS threat.
 Level 2 – Corresponding with the heightened HSAS risk coded Orange, or an elevated NTAS threat.
 Level 3 – Corresponding with the probable and imminent HSAS risk level coded Red, or an imminent NTAS threat.

The current levels are:

Transport Canada also uses MARSEC levels as legislated in the Marine Transportation Security Regulations.

References

External links

 U.S. Coast Guard Maritime Security Levels

United States Coast Guard
Disaster preparedness in the United States